Sierra de los Órganos is a mountain range in the province of Pinar del Río, western Cuba. Along with the Sierra del Rosario, it is part of the Guaniguanico mountain range.

Geography
The Sierra is the western part of Guaniguanico and spans from Guane to the San Diego River, in the municipality of Los Palacios. The other municipalities including the range are Mantua, San Juan y Martínez, Minas de Matahambre, Viñales, Pinar del Río, Consolación del Sur and La Palma.

Landmarks

In the middle of the Sierra de los Órganos is located the Viñales Valley, a natural reserve and World Heritage Site. In the east it is the protected area of Mil Cumbres, located almost entirely in the Sierra del Rosario.

See also
Pan de Guajaibón
Eleutherodactylus zeus

References

External links

Sierra de los Órganos at Encyclopædia Britannica 

Mountain ranges of Cuba
Geography of Pinar del Río Province